Lachish was an ancient Canaanite and Israelite city in the Shephelah ("lowlands of Judea") region of Israel, on the South bank of the Lakhish River, mentioned several times in the Hebrew Bible. The current tell (ruin) by that name, known as Tel Lachish or Tell ed-Duweir,, has been identified with the biblical Lachish. Today, it is an Israeli national park operated and maintained by the Israel Nature and Parks Authority. The park was established on lands of the depopulated Palestinian village of Qobebet Ibn ‘Awwad which was north of the Tel. It lies near the present-day moshav of Lakhish.

Lachish was first mentioned in the Amarna letters. In the Book of Joshua, Lachish is mentioned as one of the cities conquered by the Israelites for joining the league against the Gibeonites. The territory was later assigned to the tribe of Judah and became part of the United Kingdom of Israel. Following the kingdom's partition, Lachish emerged one of the most important cities in the Kingdom of Judah, second only to the capital, Jerusalem.

Lachish is best known for its siege and conquest by the Neo-Assyrians in 701 BCE, an event famously depicted on the Lachish Reliefs, which can be seen today in the British Museum. One of the Lachish letters, written in 597-587 BCE, warns of the impending Babylonian destruction. It reads: "Let my lord know that we are watching over the beacon of Lachish, according to the signals which my lord gave, for Azekah is not seen." According to the prophet Jeremiah, Lachish and Azekah were the last two Judean cities to fall before the conquest of Jerusalem. This pottery inscription can be seen at the Israel Museum in Jerusalem.

History

Neolithic
Occupation at the site of Lachish began during the Pottery Neolithic period (5500–4500 BCE). Flint tools from that period have been found.

Early Bronze
Major development began in the Early Bronze Age (3300–3000 BCE). By the end of the Early Bronze, Lachish had become a large settlement. Most of the recovered pottery is of Khirbet Kerak Ware.

Middle Bronze (Levels VIII–IX)
The MBA period has not been extensively excavated at the site. During the Middle Bronze (2000–1650 BCE), the settlement developed.

In the Middle Bronze I, the mound was resettled. Remains of a cult place and an assemblage of votive cultic vessels were found in Area D.

In the Middle Bronze IIA, the development continued.

In the Middle Bronze IIB-C, Lachish became a major city in the Southern Levant. An impressive glacis-like structure was constructed around the city, which shaped its present steep slopes and sharp corners. The proposed glacis fronted a city wall built of massive stones. In Area P, a large mudbrick fortress was excavated. Finds from the fortress include 4 scarabs and a number of scarab sealings. These were of "both the local Canaanite MB IIC style and the Hyksos style". Radiocarbon dating produced a date in the mid-16th century BC. By the end of Middle Bronze IIC the city was destroyed by fire. Some features originally ascribed to the Iron Age by the early excavators have now been redated to the MBA and LBA.

Late Bronze (Levels VI–VII)

In the Late Bronze Age (1550–1200 BCE), Lachish was re-established and developed slowly, eventually becoming one of the large and prosperous cities of the Southern Levant. It is first attested as Rakisha in a New Kingdom text, the Papyrus Hermitage 1116A.

It came under the 18th Dynasty of Egypt who built an Egyptian empire, especially following the military campaigns of Thutmose III.

During the Egyptian Amarna Period (c. 1350 BC), a number of letters were written to the pharaoh and were discovered as part of the Amarna archive. It is mentioned in the Amarna letters as Lakisha/Lakiša (EA 287, 288, 328, 329, 335).

During the 20th Dynasty of Egypt, the Egyptian Empire started to lose its control in the Southern Levant. While Lachish had prospered under Egyptian hegemony, it was completely destroyed by fire around 1150 BC. It was rebuilt by Canaanites who built two temples. However, this settlement was soon destroyed by another fire around 1130 BC (cf. nearby fortified Eglon, Philistines). The site then remained sparsely occupied for a long period of time (Level V). The reasons for these destruction may have been rebellions and invasions by the Sea Peoples.

Four mass graves were found at the site with over 1500 individuals interred, about half women and children. The tombs themselves dated to the Late Bronze Age but the burials contained few dateable elements so it is uncertain if the burials date to the LBA or later.

Iron Age (Levels II–IV)
Rebuilding of the city began in the Early Iron Age during the 10th and 9th centuries BCE when it was part of the Kingdom of Judah. The unfortified settlement may have been destroyed c. 925 BCE by Egyptian Pharaoh Sheshonk I. In the first half of the 9th century BCE, under the Judahite kings Asa and Jehoshaphat, Lachish became an important city in the kingdom. It was heavily fortified with massive walls and ramparts and a royal palace was built on a platform in the center of the city. Lachish was the foremost among several fortified cities and strongholds guarding the valleys that lead up to Jerusalem and the interior of the country against enemies which usually approached from the coast.

Siege by Sennacherib, Assyrian rule

In 701 BCE, during the revolt of king Hezekiah against Assyria, it was besieged and captured by Sennacherib despite the defenders' determined resistance. Some scholars believe that the fall of Lachish actually occurred during a second campaign in the area by Sennacherib ca. 688 BCE. The site now contains the only remains of an Assyrian siege ramp discovered so far. Sennacherib later devoted a whole room in his "Palace without a rival", the South-west palace in Nineveh, for artistic representations of the siege on large alabaster slabs, most of which are now on display in the British Museum. They hold depictions of Assyrian siege ramps, battering rams, sappers, and other siege machines and army units, along with Lachish's architecture and its final surrender. In combination with the archaeological finds, they give a good understanding of siege warfare of the period.

Modern excavation of the site has revealed that the Assyrians built a stone and dirt ramp up to the level of the Lachish city wall, thereby allowing the soldiers to charge up the ramp and storm the city. Excavations revealed approximately 1,500 skulls in one of the caves near the site, and hundreds of arrowheads on the ramp and at the top of the city wall, indicating the ferocity of the battle.

Babylonian occupation
Lachish fell to Nebuchadnezzar in his campaign against Judah in 586 BCE. The city was finally destroyed in 587 BCE. Residents were exiled as part of the Babylonian captivity. During Babylonian occupation, a large residence was built on the platform that had once supported the Israelite palace. At the end of the captivity, some exiled Jews returned to Lachish and built a new city with fortifications.

Under the Achaemenid Empire (Level I), a large altar (known as the Solar Shrine) on the east section of the mound was built. The shrine was abandoned after the area fell in the hands of Alexander the Great. The tell has been unoccupied since then.

Biblical references

Lachish is mentioned in several books in the Hebrew Bible. The Book of Joshua refers to Lachish in Chapter 10 (verses ), describing the Israelite conquest of Caanan. Japhia, the King of Lachish, is listed as one of the Five Amorite Kings that allied to repel the invasion. After a surprise attack from the Israelites, the kings took refuge in a cave, where they were captured and put to death. Joshua and the Israelites then took the city of Lachish after a two-day siege, exterminating the populace. In , the King of Lachish is mentioned as one of the thirty-one kings conquered by Joshua.

Rehoboam son of Solomon's fortifications of Lachish are recorded in II Chronicles .

The Book of Micah  warns the residents of Lachish that the destruction of Samaria by the Assyrians will soon spread to Judah.  mentions the Siege of Lachish; Hezekiah sends a message there offering tribute to Sennacherib in exchange for the city. In verse , the Assyrians leave Lachish and head to Jerusalem to begin an unsuccessful siege of the city.

The Jeremiah  lists Lachish as one of the last three fortified cities in Judah to fall to the Babylonian king Nebuchadnezzar II. In the Book of Nehemiah  Lachish is mentioned as an area where the people of Judah settled in the Persian period.

Identification
Initially, Lachish was identified by Flinders Petrie with Tell el-Hesi, an identification supported when a relevant cuneiform tablet was found there. The tablet mentions Zimredda a governor of who is known from one of the Amarna Letters (EA 333). The current identification of Tell ed-Duweir as Lachish was first suggested by William F. Albright in 1929 and subsequently accepted by many scholars. This suggestion is strong but circumstantial, based mostly on the geographic location of the site, the writing of Eusebius, the royal reliefs of Sennacherib, the site excavations, and an ostracon found there. Israeli archaeologist and historical geographer, M. Avi-Yonah, thought to place Lachish at the ancient ruin of Qubeibe, near the former Palestinian Arab village by the same name, rather than at Tell ed Duweir. The place has been extensively excavated.

Archaeological exploration

Starkey-Tufnell expedition (1932-1939)

The first expedition at Lachish, then Tell ed-Duweir, from 1932 to 1939, was the Starkey-Tufnell British expedition which included James Leslie Starkey as expedition leader, Olga Tufnell, G.L. Harding and C. Inge. It was funded by Charles Marston and Henry Wellcome with the aim of finding the Biblical city of Lachish. They succeeded in finding Lachish, with a "wealth of well-stratified pottery", a "key part of the ceramic corpus of Palestine", and the Lachish Letters, c. "written to the commander of the garrison at Lachish shortly before it fell to the Babylonians in either 589 or 586 B.C." Starkey was murdered in 1938 while travelling to Jerusalem to open the Rockefeller Archaeological Museum. Tufnell, Harding and Inge remained for the 1938–9 season. Tufnell returned to London and over the next two decades, worked at the Institute of Archaeology in London, "sorting, collating, studying and presenting the material found at Lachish". She completed her final publication Lachish IV in 1957. She had already become a Fellow of the Society of Antiquaries of London in 1951.

Aharoni expedition (1966, 1968)
The second was an Israeli expedition directed by Yohanan Aharoni that took place over two seasons in 1966 and 1968. The dig, which focused mainly on the "Solar Shrine", was worked on behalf of Hebrew University and Tel Aviv University. Aharoni published the findings in his 1975 publication, Investigations at Lachish: The sanctuary and the residency.

Ussishkin expedition (1973 and 1994)
The third expedition, 1973 and 1994, by a Tel Aviv University Institute of Archaeology and Israel Exploration Society team was led by David Ussishkin. Excavation and restoration work was conducted between 1973 and 1994 by a Tel Aviv University Institute of Archaeology and Israel Exploration Society team led by David Ussishkin. The excavation focused on the Late Bronze (1550–1200 BCE) and Iron Age (1200–587 BCE) levels. The Ussishkin expedition's comprehensive 5-volume report set a new standard in archaeological publication. According to Yosef Garfinkel, "The Starkey-Tufnell and Ussishkin expeditions set new standards in excavation and publication. They revolutionized our understanding of various aspects of Lachish, such as the later history of Judah and the pre-Israelite Late Bronze Age Canaanite city." Excavations of Tel Lachish continued in 2012 under the auspices of Tel Aviv University's Institute of Archaeology, conducted by Nissim Golding-Meir.

A Linear A inscription was also found at the site.

Garfinkel expedition (2013)
In 2013, a fourth expedition to Lachish was begun under the direction of Yosef Garfinkel, Michael G. Hasel, and Martin G. Klingbeil to investigate the Iron Age history of the site on behalf of the Institute of Archaeology, The Hebrew University of Jerusalem, and the Institute of Archaeology, Southern Adventist University. Other consortium institutions include Virginia Commonwealth University, Oakland University and Korea Biblical Geography Research Institute. The excavations were concentrated in the northeast corner of the site near the location of the Middle Bronze Age gate and fortress. In the topsoil, unstratified, was found a dark blue diorite scarab of the Egyptian New Kingdom period.

In 2014, during the Fourth Expedition to Lachish, led by archaeologist Saar Ganor, a small potsherd with letters from a 12th-century BCE alphabet, was found in the ruins of a Late Bronze Age temple. One researcher called it, a "once in a generation" find.

A fifth expedition, running from 2015 to 2016, was conducted as part of developing the site as a national park. A gate shrine of Level III, destroyed during the Assyrian assault and a toilet installation were found. It has been suggested that the toilet, in a gate shrine, was part of Hezekiah's campaign against idolatry. Two altars in the shrine also had their horns damaged in possible desecration.

Digs since 2017

The Korean Lachish Excavation Team led by Hong Soon-hwa, reported that they had "uncovered a wide range of 10th century BC items, from houses with earthenware items and cooking stoves, to animal bones, olive seeds, spearheads, fortress walls and other objects" on July 5, 2017.

Since 2017, the Austro-Israeli excavation is exploring the Middle and Late Bronze Age strata at the site. The project is conducted a joint project of Hebrew University and the Institute for Oriental and European Archaeology of the Austrian Academy of Sciences and is co-directed by Felix Höflmayer and Katharina Streit. The project is funded by the Austrian Science Fund.

In 2018 a pottery sherd, dated to the 15th century BC, was found with alphabetic text. This fills a gap in the development history of alphabetic writing.

Select archaeological findings

Inscriptions in Paleo-Hebrew

The first archaeological expedition, the Starkey-Starkey-Tufnell (1932-9) uncovered the Lachish letters, which were "written to the commander of the garrison at Lachish shortly before it fell to the Babylonians in either 589 or 586 B.C." The Hebrew letters were written on pieces of pottery, so-called ostraca. Eighteen letters were found in 1935 and three more in 1938, all written in Paleo-Hebrew script. They were from the latest occupational level immediately before the Babylonian siege of 587 BCE. At the time, they formed the only known corpus of documents in classical Hebrew that had come down to us outside of the Hebrew Bible.

LMLK seals
Another major contribution to Biblical archaeology from excavations at Lachish are the LMLK seals, which were stamped on the handles of a particular form of ancient storage jar, meaning "of the king". More of these artifacts were found at this site (over 400; Ussishkin, 2004, pp. 2151–9) than any other place in Israel (Jerusalem remains in second place with more than 300). Most of them were collected from the surface during Starkey's excavations, but others were found in Level 1 (Persian and Greek era), Level 2 (period preceding Babylonian conquest by Nebuchadnezzar), and Level 3 (period preceding Assyrian conquest by Sennacherib). It is thanks to the work of David Ussishkin's team that eight of these stamped jars were restored, thereby demonstrating lack of relevance between the jar volumes (which deviated as much as 5 gallons or 12 litres), and also proving their relation to the reign of Biblical king Hezekiah. Ussishkin observed that "The renewed excavations confirmed Tufnell's suggestion that Level III had been destroyed in 701 BCE. All the royal storage jars, stamped and unstamped alike, date to the reign of Hezekiah, to shortly before the Assyrian conquest.'

The 1898 Reference by Bliss, contains numerous drawings, including examples of Phoenician, etc. pottery, and items from pharaonic Egypt, and other Mediterranean, and inland regions.

Inscriptions in Proto-Canaanite
As many as 12 purported Proto-Canaanite inscriptions have been discovered at Lachish. Six were discovered in the Starkey-Tufnell excavations, two during the renewed excavations by Ussishkin, and four in more recent excavations. At least three of the purported inscriptions are likely to have been merely figural pottery designs or pseudo-inscription Among the well-known legitimate inscriptions are the Lachish Ewer, Lachish Bowl, the Cypriot Bowl Fragment, and the Ivory Lice Comb.

Inscribed Cypriot Bowl Fragment
In 2018, an inked rim fragment of a Cypriot White Slip II milk bowl was discovered, dating to the mid fifteenth century BCE.<ref name=hoflmayer>Felix Höflmayer, Haggai Misgav, Lyndelle Webster, and Katharina Streit, 2021. Early Alphabetic Writing in the Ancient Near East: The 'Missing Link' from Tel Lachish. Antiquity 95:705-719.</ref> The inscription consists of nine letters. The authors of the editio princeps offer to read two words on the inscription, ʿbd meaning "servant, slave" and npt meaning "honey, nectar." The inscription is, however, to fragmentary to suggest much else but represents one of the earliest examples of alphabetic writing from the Levant.

Inscribed Ivory Lice Comb
In 2016, an inscribed elephant ivory lice comb was found at Lachish during the Garfinkel excavations. The find is purported to bear the oldest sentence found written in the early Canaanite script. In the editio princeps, the authors suggest to read 15 letters, constituent of a wish to eradicate lice. They offer the following translation: "May this tusk root out the lice of the hai[r and the] beard.”

See also
Archaeology of Israel
Cities of the ancient Near East
List of artifacts significant to the Bible
Lachish relief

References

Further reading

 Tufnell, Olga, Margaret, Margaret A., Diringer, David, "Lachish III (Tell ed-Duweir). The Iron age", London-New York-Toronto : Oxford University Press, 1953. 
Barnett, R. D. "The Siege of Lachish." Israel Exploration Journal, vol. 8, pp. 161–164, 1958
Bliss, Frederick. Numerous artifact drawings, also "Layer by Layer" drawings of Tell el-Hesy. Also an original attempt of the only el Amarna letter found at site, Amarna Letters, EA 333. A Mound of Many Cities; or Tell El Hesy Excavated, by Frederick Jones Bliss, PhD., explorer to the Fund, 2nd Edition, Revised. (The Committee of the Palestine Exploration Fund.) c 1898.

Magrill, Pamela, A researcher's guide to the Lachish collection in the British Museum'', 2006, British Museum Research Publication 161, fully available online
 (p. 388 ff)
Arlene M. Rosen, Environmental Change and Settlement at Tel Lachish Israel, Bulletin of the American Schools of Oriental Research, no. 263, pp. 55–60, 1986
Ussishkin, D., The Renewed Archaeological Excavations at Lachish (1973–1994), Volumes I-V, Monographs of the Institute of Archaeology vol. 22, Tel Aviv University, 2004,

External links

First sentence ever written in Canaanite language discovered: A plea to eradicate beard lice - Phys.org - November 8, 2022
Jewish Encyclopedia: Lachish
Photo gallery of Lachish (Tell ed-Duweir)
Images of the Assyrian Reliefs of Lachish
Pictures of Tel Lachish
A Late Bronze Age Potter's Workshop at Lachish, Israel in Internet Archaeology

Populated places established in the 6th millennium BC
Populated places disestablished in the 4th century BC
1932 archaeological discoveries
Amarna letters locations
Archaeological sites in Israel
Canaanite cities
National parks of Israel
Hebrew Bible cities
Former populated places in Southwest Asia
Protected areas of Southern District (Israel)
Lachish
Ancient Jewish settlements of Judaea
Neolithic sites of Asia